Ronald "Ron"/"Ronnie" C. Cowan (born 26 November 1941) is a Scottish former rugby union, and professional rugby league footballer who played in the 1960s and 1970s.

Background
Cowan was born in Selkirk, Scotland.

Rugby union playing career
He also played for Selkirk RFC. He went on the 1962 British Lions tour to South Africa.

Rugby league playing career
Cowan transferred to Leeds during the 1962–63 season, and scored 119-tries during his rugby league career.

International honours
Cowan represented Other Nationalities (RL) while at Leeds, he was an interchange/substitute in the 2–19 defeat by St. Helens at Knowsley Road, St. Helens on Wednesday 27 January 1965, to mark the switching-on of new floodlights.

Challenge Cup Final appearances
Cowan played left-, i.e. number 4, (replaced by interchange/substitute Les Dyl) in Leeds' 7–24 defeat by Leigh in the 1970–71 Challenge Cup Final during the 1970–71 season at Wembley Stadium, London on Saturday 15 May 1971, in front of a crowd of 85,514.

County Cup Final appearances
Cowan played , i.e. number 2, in Leeds' 2–18 defeat by Wakefield Trinity in the 1964–65 Yorkshire County Cup Final during the 1964–65 season at Fartown Ground, Huddersfield on Saturday 31 October 1964, and played left-, i.e. number 4, in the 23–7 victory over Featherstone Rovers in the 1970–71 Yorkshire County Cup Final during the 1970–71 season at Odsal Stadium, Bradford on Saturday 21 November 1970.

BBC2 Floodlit Trophy Final appearances
Cowan played left-, i.e. number 4, in Leeds' 9–5 victory over St. Helens in the 1970 BBC2 Floodlit Trophy Final during the 1970–71 season at Headingley Rugby Stadium, Leeds on Tuesday 15 December 1970.

Genealogical information
Cowan is the son of the rugby union and rugby league footballer for Hull F.C.; James "Jim"/"Jimmy" Cowan, and the younger brother of the rugby union, and rugby league footballer; Stan Cowan.

Notes
 Bath, Richard (ed.) The Scotland Rugby Miscellany (Vision Sports Publishing Ltd, 2007 )
 Massie, Allan A Portrait of Scottish Rugby (Polygon, Edinburgh)

References

External links
Statistics at en.espn.co.uk
Search for "Cowan" at rugbyleagueproject.org
Statistics at rugbyleagueproject.org

1941 births
Living people
British & Irish Lions rugby union players from Scotland
Hull F.C. players
Leeds Rhinos players
Other Nationalities rugby league team players
Rugby league centres
Rugby league players from Selkirk, Scottish Borders
Rugby union players from Selkirk, Scottish Borders
Rugby union wings
Scotland international rugby union players
Scottish rugby league players
Scottish rugby union players
Selkirk RFC players
Rugby articles needing expert attention